Hyatt Cove is a cove at the west side of Sonia Point in Flandres Bay, on the northeast coast of Kyiv Peninsula on Danco Coast of Graham Land, Antarctica. It was discovered and roughly mapped by the Belgian Antarctic Expedition, 1897–99. It was mapped in greater detail in the 1950s by Argentine, British and Chilean expeditions, and was named by the UK Antarctic Place-Names Committee (UK-APC) in 1986 after Raymond H. Hyatt of the Cartographic Section at the Foreign and Commonwealth Office, 1949–85, and head of section from 1970, with responsibility for preparing UK-APC maps.

References

Coves of Graham Land
Danco Coast